"Everytime" (stylized in all lowercase) is a song by American singer Ariana Grande from her fourth studio album Sweetener, released in 2018. The song was written by Grande, Savan Kotecha and its producers Max Martin and Ilya Salmanzadeh.

Development and composition
Rolling Stone's Elias Leight noted "At first Grande delivers an unyielding staccato rap, but she abruptly returns to supple singing on the line-ending phrase “back to you;” the effect is like a boxer following a series of short jabs with an uppercut. As more and more pop singers are forced to reckon with trap, the fusion achieved on “Everytime” offers them a path forward. Lyrically, Grande sings about being in a toxic relationship with an ex and how she couldn't get over someone even though she knew it was unhealthy to stay involved. She expresses feelings of desire and frustration in equal measure and the song makes references to drugs and alcohol, leading some fans to speculate that the song alludes to Grande's past relationship with rapper Mac Miller.

In his review, Taylor Weatherby of Billboard called the song an "upbeat" track. In August 2018, Grande shared on social media behind-the-scenes footage from the song's recording session in which she laughs while she is singing in reaction to Max Martin's inability to keep a straight face.

Critical reception
Brittany Spanos of Rolling Stone called the song a "gorgeous, self-reflective break-up ballad". Stereogum's Chris DeVile noted "The brokenhearted trap-pop aesthetic definitely manifests on the sparkling Max Martin and Ilya production". In his review of the song, Israel Daramola of Spin wrote: "The best pop songs about love make you want to be in it, or remember it, or make you feel like you’re experiencing it, all of which is provoked at the onset of 'everytime's' twinkling production." Daramola also complimented Grande's "pristine" vocals and her relatable, convincing emotions.

Credits and personnel
Credits adapted from Tidal.

 Ariana Grande – vocals, songwriter
 Max Martin – producer, songwriter, programmer, bass, drums
 Ilya Salmanzadeh – producer, songwriter, programmer, bass, drums
 Savan Kotecha – songwriter
 Sam Holland – recording engineer, studio personnel
 Cory Bice – assistant recording engineer, studio personnel
 Jeremy Lertola – assistant recording engineer, studio personnel
 Serban Ghenea – mixer, studio personnel
 John Hanes – mix engineer, studio personnel

Live performances
Grande debuted the song live at The Sweetener Sessions.
Grande performed a shortened version of the song at her Sweetener World Tour in 2019.

Charts

References

External links
 

2018 songs
Ariana Grande songs
Song recordings produced by Max Martin
Song recordings produced by Ilya Salmanzadeh
Songs written by Ariana Grande
Songs written by Ilya Salmanzadeh
Songs written by Max Martin
Songs written by Savan Kotecha